Prooedema  is a monotypic moth genus of the family Crambidae described by George Hampson. Its only species, Prooedema inscisalis, described by Francis Walker in 1865, is found in India, China, Indonesia, the Philippines, Papua New Guinea and Australia, where it has been recorded from the Northern Territory and Queensland.

The wingspan is about 30 mm. The forewings are yellow with two brown semicircles on the inner margin. The hindwings are brown, fading to white at the base.

References

Pyraustinae
Crambidae genera
Monotypic moth genera
Taxa named by George Hampson